This is a list of National Rail stations in the metropolitan county of Tyne and Wear by 2017/2018 entries and exits. The area is also served by the light rail Tyne and Wear Metro.

See also
List of Tyne and Wear Metro stations
List of United Kingdom railway stations

References

Further reading
 Hoole, K., Railway Stations of the North East (David & Charles, 1985)
 Hoole, K., The North Eastern Electrics: The History of the Tyneside Electric Passenger Services (1904-1967), Locomotion Papers, 165 (Oakwood Press, 1987), .
 Joyce, J., Roads and Rails of Tyne and Wear, 1900-1980 (Ian Allan, 1985), 
 Thomson Sinclair, Neil, Railways of Sunderland, 2nd edn (Tyne and Wear Museums Service, 1986), 

Railway stations in Tyne and Wear
Tyne and Wear